Venus, Cupid, Bacchus, and Ceres is a painting that was completed by Peter Paul Rubens between 1612-1613. It is a depiction of four figures from Roman Mythology. The painting is currently residing at the Staatliche Museen in Berlin. 

The painting was inspired from the phrase "without Ceres and Bacchus, Venus would freeze" and was completed after his 8 year tenure at an Duke Vincenzo Gonzaga of Mantua' court in northern italy, which gave him a familiarity with roman mythological themes.

See Also 

 Minerva Protecting Peace from Mars

References 

Paintings by Peter Paul Rubens